Prathiroo is a 2012 Sri Lankan Sinhala drama film directed by Kapila Sooriyaarachchi and co-produced by Kapila Sooriyaarachchi and Harischandra Yakandawala for Sense Creations. It stars Malani Fonseka and Joe Abeywickrama in lead roles along with Jagath Benaragama and Jagath Chamila. Music composed by Darshana Ruwan Dissanayake. It is the 1170th Sri Lankan film in the Sinhala cinema.

Cast
 Malani Fonseka as Leelawathi
 Joe Abeywickrama as Siyathu
 Jagath Benaragama as Wickrama
 Jagath Chamila as Suresh
 Sriyantha Mendis as Teacher
 Palitha Silva as Monk
 Himali Sayurangi sa Purnima
 Veena Jayakody as Parwathi
 Giriraj Kaushalya as Salesman
 Wijeratne Warakagoda as Bookstore owner
 Damayanthi Fonseka as Muslim sister
 Sujeewa Priyalal
 Dharmapriya Dias as Linta
 Ajith Lokuge as Jayatissa
 Bandula Wijeweera
 Kaushalya Samarasinghe
 Dimuthu Chinthaka

References

2012 films
2010s Sinhala-language films